Arthur Dana Fradon (April 14, 1922 – October 3, 2019) was an American cartoonist. He drew roughly 1,400 cartoons for The New Yorker from 1948 to 1992, and from 1998 to 2003. He also authored several books. Fradon was born in Chicago, Illinois. He served in the United States Army Air Forces during World War II.

Selected works

References

1922 births
2019 deaths
Artists from Chicago
Writers from Chicago
Military personnel from Illinois
United States Army Air Forces personnel of World War II
People from Woodstock, New York
Art Students League of New York alumni
American cartoonists
The New Yorker cartoonists